The Second Mother of all Battles Championship, commonly referred to as the 1992 Iraqi Elite Cup, was the second occurrence of the Iraqi Elite Cup. Unlike the last season where the competition was organised by Al-Talaba, this season was organised by the Iraq Football Association. The top eight teams of the 1991–92 Iraqi National League competed in the tournament. The competition started on 2 July 1992 and ended on 17 July 1992 where, in the final, held at Al-Shaab Stadium, Al-Talaba defeated Al-Quwa Al-Jawiya after extra time.

Background
After the Iraq Football Association adopted the Iraqi Elite Cup, they held a meeting on 16 June 1992 to start the second edition of the competition which was decided to be from 2–17 July 1992 with the participation of the top eight teams from the 1991–92 Iraqi National League, instead of the top six, which included Al-Quwa Al-Jawiya, Al-Zawraa, Al-Karkh, Al-Talaba, Al-Shorta, Al-Najaf, Al-Tayaran (now known as Al-Khutoot) and Al-Naft. The FA set the matches to be played at Al-Shaab Stadium, Al-Kashafa Stadium and Al-Shorta Stadium.

Group stage
The matches were drawn on 28 June 1992.

Group 1

Group 2

Semifinals

Third place match

Final

References

External links
 Iraqi Football Website

Football competitions in Iraq
1992–93 in Iraqi football